Botryosphaeria is a genus of pathogenic fungi in the family Botryosphaeriaceae. There are 193 species, many of which are important disease-causing agents of various important agricultural crops.

Species

Botryosphaeria abietina
Botryosphaeria abrupta
Botryosphaeria abuensis
Botryosphaeria acaciae
Botryosphaeria agaves
Botryosphaeria alibagensis
Botryosphaeria anceps
Botryosphaeria apocyni
Botryosphaeria appendiculata
Botryosphaeria araliae
Botryosphaeria archontophoenicis
Botryosphaeria arctostaphyli
Botryosphaeria arundinariae
Botryosphaeria arxii
Botryosphaeria astrocaryi
Botryosphaeria aterrima
Botryosphaeria atrorufa
Botryosphaeria bakeri
Botryosphaeria berengeriana
Botryosphaeria bondarzewii
Botryosphaeria briosiana
Botryosphaeria brunneispora
Botryosphaeria buteae
Botryosphaeria callicarpae
Botryosphaeria calycanthi
Botryosphaeria camarae
Botryosphaeria cantareiensis
Botryosphaeria carpini
Botryosphaeria cassiicola
Botryosphaeria catervaria
Botryosphaeria cerasi
Botryosphaeria chnaumatica
Botryosphaeria cocogena
Botryosphaeria cocoicola
Botryosphaeria coffeae
Botryosphaeria collematoides
Botryosphaeria corticis
Botryosphaeria corticola
Botryosphaeria corynocarpi
Botryosphaeria costai
Botryosphaeria crataegi
Botryosphaeria cruenta
Botryosphaeria cunninghamiae
Botryosphaeria cyanospora
Botryosphaeria delilei
Botryosphaeria diapensiae
Botryosphaeria diplodioides
Botryosphaeria dispersa
Botryosphaeria disrupta
Botryosphaeria dothidea
Botryosphaeria effusa
Botryosphaeria egenula
Botryosphaeria elaeidis
Botryosphaeria epichloë
Botryosphaeria erythrinae
Botryosphaeria escharoides
Botryosphaeria eschweilerae
Botryosphaeria eucalypticola
Botryosphaeria eucalyptorum
Botryosphaeria euphorbii
Botryosphaeria faginea
Botryosphaeria festucae
Botryosphaeria ficina
Botryosphaeria ficus
Botryosphaeria flacca
Botryosphaeria foliicola
Botryosphaeria fourcroyae
Botryosphaeria fuliginosa
Botryosphaeria funtumiae
Botryosphaeria galegae
Botryosphaeria gaubae
Botryosphaeria gleditschiae
Botryosphaeria graphidea
Botryosphaeria halimodendri
Botryosphaeria hamamelidis
Botryosphaeria hemidesmi
Botryosphaeria heterochroma
Botryosphaeria hiascens
Botryosphaeria hibisci
Botryosphaeria horizontalis
Botryosphaeria hyperborea
Botryosphaeria hypericorum
Botryosphaeria hypoxyloidea
Botryosphaeria hysterioides
Botryosphaeria iberica
Botryosphaeria imperspicua
Botryosphaeria indica
Botryosphaeria inflata
Botryosphaeria ingae
Botryosphaeria jasmini
Botryosphaeria juglandina
Botryosphaeria juglandis
Botryosphaeria juniperi
Botryosphaeria kumaonensis
Botryosphaeria lagerheimii
Botryosphaeria lanaris
Botryosphaeria laricis
Botryosphaeria liriodendri
Botryosphaeria lutea
Botryosphaeria majuscula
Botryosphaeria malvacearum
Botryosphaeria mamane
Botryosphaeria mapaniae
Botryosphaeria marconii
Botryosphaeria mascarensis
Botryosphaeria melachroa
Botryosphaeria melanommoides
Botryosphaeria melathroa
Botryosphaeria meliae
Botryosphaeria melioloides
Botryosphaeria microspora
Botryosphaeria minor
Botryosphaeria minuscula
Botryosphaeria mirabile
Botryosphaeria molluginis
Botryosphaeria mucosa
Botryosphaeria muriculata
Botryosphaeria mutila
Botryosphaeria nephrodii
Botryosphaeria nerii
Botryosphaeria oblongula
Botryosphaeria obtusa
Botryosphaeria pachyspora
Botryosphaeria parasitica
Botryosphaeria parkinsoniae
Botryosphaeria parva
Botryosphaeria pasaniae
Botryosphaeria pedrosensis
Botryosphaeria persimon
Botryosphaeria phormii
Botryosphaeria phyllachoroidea
Botryosphaeria piceae
Botryosphaeria pinicola
Botryosphaeria pipturi
Botryosphaeria pittospori
Botryosphaeria plicatula
Botryosphaeria polita
Botryosphaeria polycocca
Botryosphaeria populi
Botryosphaeria propullulans
Botryosphaeria prosopidis
Botryosphaeria prospidis
Botryosphaeria protearum
Botryosphaeria pruni
Botryosphaeria prunicola
Botryosphaeria pruni-spinosae
Botryosphaeria pseudotsugae
Botryosphaeria pseudotubulina
Botryosphaeria purandharensis
Botryosphaeria pustulata
Botryosphaeria pyriospora
Botryosphaeria quercuum
Botryosphaeria rhizogena
Botryosphaeria rhodina
Botryosphaeria rhododendri
Botryosphaeria rhododendricola
Botryosphaeria ribis
Botryosphaeria sacchari
Botryosphaeria sarmentorum
Botryosphaeria scharifii
Botryosphaeria senegalensis
Botryosphaeria simplex
Botryosphaeria smilacinina
Botryosphaeria sorosia
Botryosphaeria spiraeae
Botryosphaeria stevensii
Botryosphaeria stomatica
Botryosphaeria subconnata
Botryosphaeria subtropica
Botryosphaeria syconophila
Botryosphaeria syringae
Botryosphaeria tamaricis
Botryosphaeria theicola
Botryosphaeria tiampeana
Botryosphaeria tiliacea
Botryosphaeria tjampeana
Botryosphaeria trabutiana
Botryosphaeria trames
Botryosphaeria tropicalis
Botryosphaeria tsugae
Botryosphaeria uleana
Botryosphaeria uncariae
Botryosphaeria vanillae
Botryosphaeria vanvleckii
Botryosphaeria venenata
Botryosphaeria viburni
Botryosphaeria viscosa
Botryosphaeria vitis
Botryosphaeria weigelae
Botryosphaeria wisteriae
Botryosphaeria xanthocephala
Botryosphaeria xanthorrhoeae
Botryosphaeria yedoensis
Botryosphaeria zeae

References

 
Dothideomycetes genera
Taxa named by Vincenzo de Cesati
Taxa named by Giuseppe De Notaris
Taxa described in 1863